Founded in 1944, the Wichita Symphony Orchestra (WSO) is the oldest professional Symphony Orchestra in Kansas, performing out of Century II Concert Hall in downtown Wichita.

The Orchestra’s annual activities include an 8-concert Masterworks series, Pops concerts and free, citywide presentations.

Mission Statement
The mission of the Wichita Symphony is to enrich, educate, and entertain diverse audiences of all ages in our region through performances of orchestral music, thereby enhancing the vibrancy and vitality of Wichita.

Artistic Leadership 
As of the 2019-2020 Season

Daniel Hege, Music Director & Conductor

Matthew Udland, Interim Chorus Director

Dr. Mark Laycock, Director of Youth Orchestras Program, Youth Symphony Conductor

Dr. Wesley DeSpain, Repertory Orchestra Conductor

Eric Crawford, Youth Chamber Players Conductor

Dr. Timothy Shade, Youth Wind Ensemble Conductor

Educational Activities

Young People's Concerts 
Young People’s Concerts (YPCs) are performed for area third through eighth grade students every fall and winter, reaching approximately 24,000 students and their teachers each year. These 40-minute programs feature the full Wichita Symphony Orchestra and often utilize actors or dancers to illustrate the program.

Wichita Symphony Youth Orchestras (WSYO) 
Founded in 1947, WSYO’s Youth Symphony is a charter member of the Youth Symphony Orchestra Division of the League of American Orchestras. Today, the Wichita Symphony Youth Orchestras Program is made up of four ensembles that serve over 250 students from 22 cities and towns in central Kansas and northern Oklahoma. WSYO ensembles include the Youth Symphony, Repertory Orchestra, Youth Chamber Players, and Wind Ensemble.

In 2018, The Wichita Symphony Youth Orchestras commissioned WSYO alumni, Logan Nelson, to perform his orchestra piece on their spring concert on March 2, 2019 as well as their concert with the Colorado Springs Youth Symphony on March 10, 2019.

Kinderconcerts 
Children receive their first introduction to the Wichita Symphony in the form of KinderConcerts. Members of the Bloomfield String Quartet, four Wichita State University graduate student musicians in the Wichita Symphony, perform free in-school concerts at Wichita public elementary schools each year. The programs are geared for Kindergarten through second grade and introduce students to the string instrument family and classical music in a lively manner that illustrates the basics of music— melody, rhythm, etc.— using an entertaining story that appeals to children.

Important Milestones 
1944 Wichita Symphony Orchestra Founded

1946 Wichita Symphony Youth Orchestras (WSYO) formed

1946 Women's Association of the Wichita Symphony (WAWS) formed

1969 Wichita Symphony moves from East High School Auditorium to Century II Performing Arts Center

1978 Wichita Symphony Orchestra Chorus is formed

1979 WAWS presents the first Symphony Showhouse in support of the Wichita Symphony

1981 Wichita Symphony presents first free Family Holiday Concert

History of Conductors
Orien Dally (1944)

James Robertson (1950)

Francois Huybrechts (1972)

Michael Palmer (1977)

Zuohuang Chen (1990)

Andrew Sewell (2000)

Daniel Hege (2010–present)

See also
List of symphony orchestras in the United States

References

External links
Wichita Symphony Orchestra

American orchestras
Musical groups established in 1944
Musical groups from Kansas
Symphony orchestra
Tourist attractions in Wichita, Kansas
Wikipedia requested audio of orchestras
Performing arts in Kansas
1944 establishments in Kansas